John Sills Jones (February 12, 1836 – April 11, 1903) was a U.S. Representative from Ohio who also served as an officer in the Union Army during the American Civil War.

Biography
Jones was born near St. Paris, Champaign County, Ohio, where he attended the public schools. Studying law he graduated from Ohio Wesleyan University, Delaware, Ohio, in 1855. He was admitted to the bar in 1857 and commenced practice in Delaware, Ohio; where he served as prosecuting attorney for Delaware County in 1860 and 1861. 
Wanting to serve in the Civil War he was commissioned a First Lieutenant in the 4th Ohio Infantry Regiment in 1861. After 3 years he reenlisted, and in September 1864 he was given command of the 174th Ohio Infantry Regiment with the rank of colonel. Jones was mustered out with his regiment on July 7, 1865, and received a brevet promotion to brigadier general on June 27.

Jones afterwards resumed the practice of law. In 1866 he served as mayor of Delaware, Ohio, and afterwards became prosecuting attorney again until 1872. He was elected as a Republican to the Forty-fifth Congress (March 4, 1877 – March 3, 1879) and served as a member of the State house of representatives (1879-1884). Jones died on April 11, 1903, and was interred in Oak Grove Cemetery.

See also

References
 Retrieved on 2008-11-05

External links

1836 births
1903 deaths
Republican Party members of the Ohio House of Representatives
Mayors of places in Ohio
Ohio lawyers
Ohio Wesleyan University alumni
Union Army colonels
People of Ohio in the American Civil War
People from Champaign County, Ohio
Burials at Oak Grove Cemetery, Delaware, Ohio
County district attorneys in Ohio
19th-century American politicians
Republican Party members of the United States House of Representatives from Ohio